The year 2003 was the 222nd year of the Rattanakosin Kingdom of Thailand. It was the 58th year in the reign of King Bhumibol Adulyadej (Rama IX), and is reckoned as year 2546 in the Buddhist Era. The war on drugs of Thaksin Shinawatra's government was launched this year, resulting in almost 3,000 deaths.

Incumbents
King: Bhumibol Adulyadej 
Crown Prince: Vajiralongkorn
Prime Minister: Thaksin Shinawatra
Supreme Patriarch: Nyanasamvara Suvaddhana

Events

January
2003 Bangkok International Film Festival took place from January 10 to 21 in Bangkok. A list of award winners can be viewed here

June
Pak Phanang school shooting took place on June 6 at Pak Phanang school in Nakhon Si Thammarat.

October
October 20–21 APEC Thailand 2003 took place in Bangkok, Thailand.

Births

Deaths

See also
 2003 Thailand national football team results
 Miss Thailand Universe 2003
 2003 Thailand Open (tennis)
 2003 in Thai television
 List of Thai films of 2003

References

External links
Year 2003 Calendar - Thailand

 
Years of the 21st century in Thailand
Thailand
2000s in Thailand
Thailand